Lucas Rafael Bennazar Ortiz (born February 7, 1969 in Guaynabo) is a Puerto Rican sport shooter. At age thirty-five, Bennazar made his official debut for the 2004 Summer Olympics in Athens, where he competed in two shotgun events. He placed twenty-seventh in the men's trap, with a score of 112 points, tying his position with France's Yves Tronc and Italy's Marco Venturini. Few days later, he competed for his second event, the double trap, where he was able to fire 3 sets of 50 shots, for an overall total score of 122 points, finishing only in twenty-third place.

At the 2008 Summer Olympics in Beijing, Bennazar competed for the second time in the men's double trap, an event which was later dominated by U.S. shooter Walton Eller. In the qualifying rounds, Bennazar fired a total of 123 shots in three different sets, finishing only in seventeenth place.

References

External links
NBC 2008 Olympics profile

Puerto Rican male sport shooters
Living people
Olympic shooters of Puerto Rico
Shooters at the 2004 Summer Olympics
Shooters at the 2008 Summer Olympics
People from Guaynabo, Puerto Rico
1969 births
Shooters at the 2015 Pan American Games
Pan American Games medalists in shooting
Pan American Games bronze medalists for Puerto Rico